The following events occurred in November 1926:

Monday, November 1, 1926
Secretary General of Italy Augusto Turati made a speech in Rome's Piazza Colonna demanding execution for anyone who attempted to assassinate Benito Mussolini.
The new betting tax came into effect in the United Kingdom.
Born: Betsy Palmer, actress, in East Chicago, Indiana (d. 2015)

Tuesday, November 2, 1926
The United States midterm elections were held. The Democratic Party picked up nine seats in the House of Representatives and six in the Senate, but the Republican Party maintained their majorities in both. 
French pediatrician Gaston Variot warned young women not to dance the Charleston, because its "sudden wrenching movements" were "likely to produce internal conditions inimical to the proper conditions of childbirth."
Born: Tsung-Dao Lee, physicist and Nobel Prize laureate, in Shanghai, China (alive in 2021)
Died: Bill Bailey, 38, American baseball player

Wednesday, November 3, 1926
The Barnes-Hecker Mine disaster occurred in Ishpeming, Michigan, the worst industrial tragedy in Michigan's history. 51 men died when an explosion in the mine filled the tunnels with water from a nearby swamp.   
Born: Valdas Adamkus, President of Lithuania, in Kaunas (alive in 2021)
Died: Annie Oakley, 66, sharpshooter

Thursday, November 4, 1926

Prince Leopold of Belgium and Princess Astrid of Sweden were married in Stockholm. Mayor Carl Lindhagen presided.
George W. English resigned as a United States federal judge before his impeachment trial proceedings could begin.

Friday, November 5, 1926
Talks reopened in Britain between the government and the Miners' Federation to end the coal miners' lockout as it dragged into its seventh month.

Saturday, November 6, 1926

A new, far-reaching police law was enacted in Italy giving the government extensive powers of confinement and extending its power to dissolve political and cultural organizations. A new deportation law allowed for persons to be restricted to certain localities within Italy for light offenses or exiled to penal colonies for more serious ones. Benito Mussolini also reclaimed the Italian Minister of the Interior position for himself, and Italo Balbo was appointed undersecretary for the Air Ministry.
Born: Frank Carson, comedian, in Belfast, Northern Ireland (d. 2012)

Sunday, November 7, 1926
Greece held a legislative election; the Liberal Union emerged as the largest party in Parliament. 
In Poland, Marshal Józef Piłsudski decreed a press gag law. The law forbade publishing news that could cause a public demonstration, news or rumors that ridiculed or criticized government officials and judges, and matter considered by government officials to be derogatory. Government officials were empowered to impose fines or jail sentences without a court hearing.
Born: Joan Sutherland, Australian singer, in Sydney (d. 2010)
Died: Tom Forman, 33, American actor and director (suicide)

Monday, November 8, 1926
The George Gershwin musical Oh, Kay! opened on Broadway.
Died: James Keteltas Hackett, 57, American actor and manager

Tuesday, November 9, 1926
All opposition members of the Italian parliament lost their seats as a new law deprived them of parliamentary immunity and Socialists were punished for staging the Aventine Secession. Antonio Gramsci of the dissolved Communist Party of Italy was arrested in Rome and imprisoned in the Regina Coeli.

Wednesday, November 10, 1926
Princeton University severed athletic relations with Harvard. A formal letter from Princeton explained, "We have been forced to the conviction that it is at present impossible to expect in athletic competition with Harvard that spirit of cordial good will between the undergraduate bodies of the two universities which should characterize college sports."

Thursday, November 11, 1926

The United States Numbered Highway System, including U.S. Route 66, was established.
U.S. President Calvin Coolidge dedicated the Liberty Memorial in Kansas City, Missouri.
The Nicaraguan Congress elected Adolfo Díaz as president.

Friday, November 12, 1926
Miners' leaders and the British government reached an agreement on the ending of the coal miners' dispute. The miners essentially gave in to the owners' demands, including that the workday be increased from seven hours to eight. Some 300,000 miners had already returned to work by this time through localized settlements.
In Harrisburg, Illinois, the Shelton Brothers Gang used a Curtiss JN-4 biplane to try to bomb rival gangster Charles Birger's hideout, "Shady Rest", from the air. The bombing raid only succeeded in blowing up the cock fighting pit.
Died: Joseph Gurney Cannon, 90, United States politician

Saturday, November 13, 1926
 

A short story appeared in the New Zealand newspaper The Christchurch Sun about a nanny's day out, titled "Mary Poppins and the Match Man". The author, P. L. Travers, would later write a series of children's books about the Mary Poppins character that would be adapted into a musical film by Walt Disney in 1964.
The former Crown Prince Wilhelm and his son were attacked by an angry mob at the Friedrichstraße when they got out of a car flying the Hohenzollern flag. Police intervened and held up traffic until they could ride away again.
Mario de Bernardi of Italy won the Schneider Trophy in Hampton Roads, Virginia.

Sunday, November 14, 1926

Adolfo Díaz became President of Nicaragua for the second time.

Monday, November 15, 1926
The National Broadcasting Company (NBC) officially came into being.
The Balfour Declaration was unanimously approved at the Imperial Conference.

Tuesday, November 16, 1926
Marshal Józef Piłsudski threatened to dissolve the Polish parliament if radicals did not stop their attacks on the press gag law.
Born: Amy Applegren, baseball player, in Peoria, Illinois (d. 2011)

Wednesday, November 17, 1926
Mario de Bernardi achieved a speed of 258.874 miles per hour in his Macchi M.39, a new seaplane record.
Died: George Sterling, 66, American poet

Thursday, November 18, 1926
Pope Pius XI promulgated Iniquis afflictisque, an encyclical denouncing the persecution of Roman Catholics in Mexico.
It was revealed that the Irish writer and playwright George Bernard Shaw had refused the £7,000 in prize money awarded to him a year ago for his Nobel Prize in Literature, and the Swedish Academy had been begging him to take it ever since. Tired of the standoff, Shaw declared, "I can forgive Alfred Nobel for having invented dynamite, but only a fiend in human form could have invented the Nobel Prize!"  
Born: Roy Sievers, baseball player, in St. Louis, Missouri (d. 2017)

Friday, November 19, 1926
The Paramount Theatre opened in New York City. 
Born: Jeane Kirkpatrick, ambassador, in Duncan, Oklahoma (d. 2006)

Saturday, November 20, 1926
The Balfour Declaration was announced to the public at the Imperial Conference in London. Canada, Australia, New Zealand, South Africa and Newfoundland would become self-governing dominions. 
The Irish Free State declared a national state of emergency due to Republican Army raids around the country.
Born: John Gardner, spy novelist, in Seaton Delaval, England (d. 2007); and Andrew Schally, endocrinologist and recipient of the Nobel Prize in Physiology or Medicine, in Wilno, Second Polish Republic (alive in 2023)

Sunday, November 21, 1926
Chiang Kai-shek told the Associated Press that the revolution in China would not end until the unequal treaties with foreign powers were all abolished.
The film The Great Gatsby, based on the F. Scott Fitzgerald novel of the same name, was released.

Monday, November 22, 1926
Italian trade unionist Captain Giuseppe Giulietti, loyal to the Fascists but out of favour for his brand of syndicalism, was arrested in Genoa for purported embezzlement.
Born: Lew Burdette, baseball player, in Nitro, West Virginia (d. 2007)

Tuesday, November 23, 1926
The war film What Price Glory? was released.
Born: Sathya Sai Baba, guru, in Puttaparthi, British Raj (d. 2011); and R. L. Burnside, blues musician, in Harmontown, Mississippi (d. 2005)

Wednesday, November 24, 1926
Queen Marie of Romania ended her visit to the United States and Canada, departing from New York aboard the SS Berengaria.
Died: Leonid Krasin, 56, Russian politician and diplomat

Thursday, November 25, 1926
Benito Mussolini created a special Court for political crimes and reintroduced the death penalty to Italy for attempts on the life of the royal family or Head of State, acts of espionage and incitement of civil war.
Italian political prisoner Antonio Gramsci was sent to the prison island of Ustica.
Born: Poul Anderson, American science fiction author, in Bristol, Pennsylvania (d. 2001)

Friday, November 26, 1926
King Ferdinand of Romania was reported to be gravely ill, sparking fears that a civil war might break out if he were to die as the heir to the throne, Michael, was five years old and Queen Marie was still on an ocean liner in the Atlantic.
Italy put its anti-striking law to use for the first time, fining eighty-one clothing workers in Gallarate 100 lira each for stopping work.
Boston mayor Malcolm E. Nichols married the twin sister of his late first wife.
Died: John Moses Browning, 71, American firearms designer

Saturday, November 27, 1926

The Treaty of Tirana was signed between Italy and Albania, establishing a de facto Italian protectorate over Albania.
King Ferdinand of Romania was officially reported to have been doing better, dispelling rumors within the country that he was dead.
The Sherlock Holmes short story "The Adventure of the Lion's Mane" by Sir Arthur Conan Doyle was published for the first time in Liberty magazine in the United States.
The Army-Navy Game at Soldier Field in Chicago ended in a 21–21 tie.
The restoration of Colonial Williamsburg began in Williamsburg, Virginia.

Sunday, November 28, 1926
13 were injured and 60 arrested in Berlin during fighting among communists, Nazis and Reichsbanner members pertaining to the death of Leonid Krasin.  
Benito Mussolini restored the right among members of the Fascist Party to criticize government policies.

Monday, November 29, 1926
Duke Ellington and his band recorded "East St. Louis Toodle-Oo" for the first time. The jazz tune became one of Ellington's best known numbers and a sort of theme song for the bandleader.

Tuesday, November 30, 1926
The final holdouts in the British coal miners' lockout – South Wales, Yorkshire, and Durham – returned to work, ending the labour dispute after seven months. 
King Ferdinand of Romania issued an edict from his sick bed warning against anyone attempting to interfere with the established dynastic succession to the throne. The message was widely understood to have been directed at Prince Carol, who had renounced the throne over a scandalous affair. 
Fascist Italy announced that it was exiling 522 political undesirables to specified towns or penal colonies under the new deportation laws.
Born: Richard Crenna, actor, in Los Angeles, California (d. 2003)

References

1926
1926-11
1926-11